Pio is the surname of:

 Angelo Piò (1690–1770), Italian sculptor
 Antonio Pio (composer) (1753–1795), Italian composer
 Antonio Pio (painter) (1809–1871), Italian painter
 Domenico Piò (1715–1801), Italian sculptor, son of Angelo Piò
 Emmanuel Pío (born 1988), Argentine footballer
 Iørn Piø (1927–1998), Danish folklorist, historian and archivist
 Louis Pio (1841–1894), one of the founders of the organized worker's movement in Denmark and principal founder of the Danish Social Democratic Party
 Teodoro Pio (died 1561), Italian Roman Catholic bishop